Michael "Max" Cantor (May 15, 1959 – October 3, 1991) was an American journalist and actor in films such as Dirty Dancing (1987) and Fear, Anxiety & Depression (1989).

Biography 
Cantor's father was the theatrical producer Arthur Cantor. He grew up in the Dakota Apartments on West 72nd Street in Manhattan, New York City. Cantor attended  Collegiate School but graduated from Buxton School in Williamstown, Massachusetts. He spent his summers until age 14 at Camp Hillcroft in Billings, New York, alongside fellow campers such as the children of American Federation of Teachers president Albert Shanker and actor Burt Lancaster. At camp, he won top roles in Winnie the Pooh and The Velveteen Rabbit. Cantor was a 1982 graduate of Harvard University, where he lived in Adams House and starred in several productions by student director Peter Sellars.

Career 
Cantor wrote for The Village Voice about ibogaine as a cure for heroin addiction, and had taken an interest in the cult surrounding East Village cannibal/murderer Daniel Rakowitz.

Death 
He died from a heroin overdose at the age of 32. At the time he died, he was conducting research and writing a book about Rakowitz and the murder of dancer Monika Beerle.

Filmography

References

Bibliography
"The Strange Sad Death of Max Cantor", Sarah Ferguson, 'Esquire' February 1992, pp. 45 - 49.

External links 
 

1959 births
1991 deaths
Harvard University alumni
American male film actors
Deaths by heroin overdose in New York (state)
Male actors from New York City
Ibogaine activists
American psychedelic drug advocates
20th-century American male actors
People from the Upper West Side
Drug-related deaths in New York City
Buxton School (Massachusetts) alumni
Collegiate School (New York) alumni